Serge Michel (born 10 September 1988) is a German professional boxer. As an amateur he represented Germany in the light-heavyweight division at the 2016 Summer Olympics.

Professional boxing career
On April 6, 2019, Michel faced off against Canadian boxer Ryan Ford in a fight for the WBC International Silver light heavyweight title.  Michel would go on to suffer the his first loss  of his career after losing via knockout in the eighth round.

On September 30, 2020, Michel took on Liam Conroy in the semi-finals of the Golden Contract light heavyweight tournament. Michel went on to win the fight via technical knockout in the fourth round to advance to the finals of the tournament.

On December 2, 2020, Michel faced off against Ričards Bolotņiks in the finals of the Golden Contract light heavyweight tournament for the WBO European light heavyweight title. Michel would go on to lose via technical knockout in the tenth round.

On October 2, 2021, Michel returned to boxing after a near one year absence to take on Stephane Tchamba. Michel would go on to win the fight via a third round technical knockout.

Professional boxing record

References

External links
 

1988 births
Living people
German male boxers
Olympic boxers of Germany
Light-heavyweight boxers
World Boxing Council champions
Boxers at the 2016 Summer Olympics